Princess Duan is the name of:

Princess Duan (Murong Chui's wife) (died 358), first wife of the Former Yan general Murong Chui
Princess Duan (Murong Huang's wife), wife of the Chinese/Xianbei state Former Yan founder Murong Huang

See also
Empress Duan (disambiguation)